The Mapimí Silent Zone is the popular name for a desert patch near the Bolsón de Mapimí in Durango, Mexico, overlapping the Mapimí Biosphere Reserve. It is the subject of an urban legend that claims it is an area where radio signals and any type of communications cannot be received.

History and legends
The area was once an ancient seabed in the Tethys Ocean, which left marine fossils and large salt deposits which are mined today.

In July 1970, an Athena RTV test rocket launched from the Green River Launch Complex in Utah towards the White Sands Missile Range in New Mexico lost control and fell in the Mapimí Desert region.
When the rocket went off course, it was carrying two small containers of cobalt 57, an isotope used in "salted bombs" to intentionally contaminate large areas of land.
As part of the cleanup effort, hundreds of tons of soil were removed from the impact site. 

As a result of the US Air Force recovery operation, a number of myths and legends relating to the area arose. Reportedly, a local resident hired to guard the crash debris during recovery operations helped spread these rumors. Legends include "strange magnetic anomalies that prevent radio transmission", mutations of flora and fauna, and extraterrestrial visitations, which have been used by locals to promote tourism in the region.

See also
 Radio silence
 Skip zone

References

Further reading 
 Guia Roji, México Tourist Atlas 2002, p. 70. .
 Zona del Silencio and its Legend
 

Geography of Durango
Paranormal places in Mexico
Urban legends
Mexican mythology